Binn is a computer data serialization format used mainly for application data transfer. It stores primitive data types and data structures in a binary form.

Performance
The Binn format is designed to be compact and fast on readings. The elements are stored with their sizes to increase the read performance. The strings are null terminated so when read the library returns a pointer to them inside the buffer, avoiding memory allocation and data copying, an operation known as zero-copy.

Data types
Primitive data types:

 null
 boolean (true and false)
 integer (up to 64 bits signed or unsigned)
 floating point numbers (IEEE single/double precision)
 string
 blob (binary data)
 User defined

Containers:

 list
 map (numeric key associative array)
 object (text key associative array)

Format 

Binn structures consist of a list of elements. Each element has a type that can be followed by the size, count of internal items, and the data itself:

boolean, null:
[type]

int, float (storage: byte, word, dword or qword):
[type][data]

string, blob:
[type][size][data]

list, object, map:
[type][size][count][data]

Example encoding  
A JSON data such as {"hello":"world"} is serialized in binn with the same size:

  \xE2                               // type = object (container)
  \x11                               // container total size
  \x01                               // items in the container (key/value pairs in this case)
  \x05hello                          // field name
  \xA0                               // type = string
  \x05world\x00                      // field value (null terminated)

Example code 
Writing to an object in C:
// create a new object
binn * obj = binn_object();

// add values to it
binn_object_set_int32(obj, "id", 123);
binn_object_set_str(obj, "name", "John");
binn_object_set_double(obj, "total", 2.55);

// send over the network or save to a file...
send(sock, binn_ptr(obj), binn_size(obj));

// release the buffer
binn_free(obj);

Reading from that object:

int id = binn_object_int32(obj, "id");
char * name = binn_object_str(obj, "name");
double total = binn_object_double(obj, "total");

See also 
 JSON
 BSON
 UBJSON
 MessagePack
 Protocol Buffers
 Comparison of data serialization formats

Usages
 LiteReplica, SQLite replication and point-in-time recovery tool.
 EJDB2, Embeddable JSON Database engine C library.
 GameAP, Game servers management panel.

References

External links 
 Binn on GitHub

Data serialization formats